Pencarnisiog is a village in the  community of Llanfaelog, Ynys Môn, Wales, which is 132.9 miles (213.8 km) from Cardiff and 218.5 miles (351.6 km) from London.

There is a Welsh-medium primary school, Ysgol Gynradd Pencarnisiog, in the village, founded in 1911. As of January 2018, the school had the second highest percentage of pupils (aged 5 and over) who spoke Welsh at home in Wales, at 95.6%.

References

See also
List of localities in Wales by population

Villages in Anglesey